Llanbadarn may refer to:

Llanbadarn Fawr, Ceredigion, a community in Ceredigion, Wales
Llanbadarn Fawr, Powys, a community in Powys, Wales
Llanbadarn Fynydd, a community in Powys, Wales
Llanbadarn Trefeglwys, a village in Ceredigion, Wales
Llanbadarn y Garreg, a village in Powys, Wales